The 2020–21 season was Noravank's first season in the Armenian Premier League.

Season events
On 25 July, Noravank announced the signing of Julius Ufuoma from Pyunik, Erik Petrosyan from Sevan, Davit Minasyan from Alashkert, and Arman Mkrtchyan from Noah.

The next day, 26 July, Igor Zonjić signed for Noravank from Napredak Kruševac, and Ebert joined from Metalist Kharkiv.

On 28 July, Noravank announced the signing of Mikhail Bashilov from Energetik-BGU Minsk.

On 6 August, Noravank announced the signing of Temur Mustafin from Chernomorets Novorossiysk.

On 10 August, Noravank announced the signing of Vladislav Yarukov from Dynamo-2 Moscow.

On 18 August, Noravank announced the signing of Dusan Cubrakovic from Zlatibor Čajetina.

On 10 September, Noravank announced the signing of Artur Sokhiyev from Rostov.

On the final day of the transfer window, 14 September, Noravank announced the signing of Sunday Ingbede, who'd been a free agent after leaving Alashkert at the end of the previous season.

On 25 December, Benjamin Techie, Christian Boateng and Gideon Boateng all had their loan deals with Noravank ended early by mutual consent. The following day, 26 December, Dusan Cubrakovic and Igor Zonjić both left Noravank after their contracts where ended by mutual consent.

On 18 January, Artur Sokhiyev left Noravank by mutual consent.

On 28 January, Noravank announced the signing of Artur Avagyan and, who'd previously played for Sevan, and free agent Henri Avagyan.

On 8 February, Noravank announced the signing of free agent Yevgeni Kobzar.

On 13 February, Noravank announced the singing of Shuaibu Ibrahim from Jerv.

On 16 February, Noravank announced the singing of Tenton Yenne from MŠK Žilina.

On 19 February, Noravank announced the singing of Timur Rudoselsky, who'd previously played for Sevan.

On 8 March, Noravank announced the singing of Moses Candidus from Fremad Amager.

Squad

Transfers

In

Loans in

Released

Friendlies

Competitions

Overall record

Premier League

Results summary

Results by round

Results

Table

Armenian Cup

Final

Statistics

Appearances and goals

|-
|colspan="16"|Players away on loan:
|-
|colspan="16"|Players who left Noravank during the season:

|}

Goal scorers

Clean sheets

Disciplinary Record

References

Noravank SC seasons
Noravank